Antilliscaris is a genus of beetles in the family Carabidae, containing the following species:

 Antilliscaris danforthi (Darlington, 1939)
 Antilliscaris darlingtoni (Bänninger, 1935)
 Antilliscaris megacephala (T. F. Hlavac, 1969)
 Antilliscaris mutchleri (Bänninger, 1939)

References

Scaritinae